The European Club Association (ECA) is a body representing the interests of professional association football clubs in UEFA. It is the sole such body recognised by the confederation, and has member clubs in each UEFA member association. It was formed in 2008 after the merge between the G-14 and the European Club Forum, which comprised a small number of elite clubs and was unrecognised by UEFA. The ECA's mission statement is "to create a new, more democratic governance model that truly reflects the key role of the clubs". After the 2022 Russian invasion of Ukraine, the ECA suspended its seven Russian members - Zenit St Petersburg, FC Spartak Moscow, Lokomotiv Moscow, CSKA Moscow, FC Krasnodar, Rubin Kazan, and FC Rostov.

History 
Formed on the merge of the G-14 group with the European Club Forum, a task force created by UEFA in 2002 that reuned 102 member clubs, in January 2008, as from the 2017–19 membership cycle, the European Club Association represented 232 clubs, made up of 109 Ordinary Members and 123 Associated Members, with at least one from each of the 54 national associations. The precise number of Ordinary Member clubs from each member association will be established every two years at the end of the UEFA season on the basis of the UEFA ranking of its member associations according to the following principles:

Karl-Heinz Rummenigge was the acting chairman before officially being elected chairman of the ECA when its 103 members met for the first time on the 7–8 July 2008 at UEFA headquarters in Nyon, Switzerland.

In addition to replacing the G-14, which was dissolved in favour of the ECA on 15 February 2008, the new ECA also replaces UEFA's European Club Forum (of which Karl-Heinz Rummenigge was also chairman). The European Club Forum utilized a similar membership selection process as the European Club Association, with 102 members picked every two years.

In April 2021 following the announcement of the European Super League, several of the clubs involved resigned from the ECA. The ECA had criticised the formation of the new league. On 7 May 2021, UEFA approved reintegration measures for nine clubs involved in that breakaway competition.

After the 2022 Russian invasion of Ukraine, the ECA suspended its seven Russian members - Zenit St Petersburg, FC Spartak Moscow, Lokomotiv Moscow, CSKA Moscow, FC Krasnodar, Rubin Kazan, and FC Rostov.

Structure 
At the creation of the European Club Association in January 2008, it was agreed that a transitional ECA Board would represent ECA and its 16 founding members until the next General Assembly met at the end of the season, when elections for a new executive board would be held. It was decided that the ECA Board would comprise eleven members, in addition to the four representatives appointed by the executive board to the UEFA Professional Football Strategy Council. The European Club Association will also provide half of the members of the UEFA Club Competitions Committee.

The transitional ECA Board was Karl-Heinz Rummenigge (Chairman; Bayern Munich), Joan Laporta (Vice-chairman; Barcelona), John McClelland (Vice-chairman; Rangers), Umberto Gandini (Vice-chairman; Milan), Peter Kenyon (Chelsea), Maarten Fontein (AZ) and Jean-Michel Aulas (Lyon).

The ECA Executive Board (2017–2021) stood as: Dan Friedkin (AS Roma), Andrea Agnelli (Juventus), Pedro López Jiménez (Real Madrid), Edwin van der Sar (Ajax), Dariusz Mioduski (Legia Warsaw), Aki Riihilahti (HJK), Ed Woodward (Manchester United), Ivan Gazidis (AC Milan), Josep Maria Bartomeu (FC Barcelona), Nasser Al-Khelaifi (Paris Saint-Germain FC), Jean-Michel Aulas (Olympique Lyonnais), Domingos Soares de Oliveira (S.L. Benfica), Michael Gerlinger (FC Bayern München), Michael Verschueren (Anderlecht), Niclas Carlnén (Malmö FF) and Peter Lawwell (Celtic). Elections for the executive board for the 2017–2019 cycle took place at the General Assembly in Geneva in September 2017, the following elections took place in July 2021.

The European Club Association is made up of numerous bodies including working groups, expert panels and committees. These are as follows:

Working Groups 
Since the creation of ECA, Working Groups have been an important cornerstone of ECA's organisational structure. They provide active advice and support to the ECA Executive Board and to ECA representatives participating in committees or working groups at UEFA, FIFA and EU level. Their contribution is key and strategic to the association. In addition, they drive membership engagement and communication across the organisation on key issues, challenges and opportunities. All working groups are made up of both Ordinary Member and Associated Member Clubs from all four subdivisions.

Competitions Working Group: Chaired by Umberto Gandini (AS Roma), the Competitions Working Group aims to lead the management and control of the club competitions through the relevant UEFA and FIFA club football committees.

Finance Working Group: Chaired by ECA Executive Board Member Michael Verschueren (RSC Anderlecht), the Finance Working Group strives to address all issues related to club finance, to optimise resource allocation and club business management.

Institutional Relations Working Group: Chaired by ECA Executive Board Member Ivan Gazidis (Arsenal FC), the Institutional Relations Working Group seeks to strengthen the ECA position and representation among different stakeholders in European football.

Marketing & Communication Working Group: Chaired by Aurelio De Laurentiis (SSC Napoli), the Marketing & Communication Working Group oversees issues on club football marketing, communication and promotion, and aims to define a coherent and up-to-date strategy around commercial opportunities.

Youth Working Group: Chaired by ECA Executive Board Member Edwin van der Sar (Ajax), the Youth Working Group attempts to stimulate, develop and protect the grassroots of European club football.

Expert Panels 
Legal Advisory Panel: tasked with bringing together legal experts and arbitration members of ECA Member Clubs in order to share expertise and knowledge and act as a mediator for any Member Club dispute.

Financial Fair Play Panel: charged with collaborating with UEFA in order to further elaborate, implement and assess the UEFA Club Licensing and Financial Fair Play Regulations.

Statutory Affairs Panel: Entrusted with dealing with and analyzing membership applications, issues of eligibility of Members and the interpretation and application of the ECA Statutes.

Committees 
Social Dialogue Committee: Ensures a close relationship between ECA, European Leagues, FIFPro Division Europe, UEFA and the European Commission in order to agree common solutions on matters concerning employment in football.

Women's Football Committee: Created in 2013, the overall objective of the Women's Football Committee (WFC) is to act as a platform where issues related to women's women's football, be it on a European or on a worldwide level, are discussed. The WFC is composed of representatives from ECA Member Clubs with a Women's section, as well as representatives from Women's Football clubs without a direct link to ECA Membership. The WFC Members are appointed by the ECA Executive Board based on a proposal by the WFC Chairman. The committee is currently chaired by ECA Executive Board Member and Olympique Lyonnais President Jean-Michel Aulas. The vice-chairwoman is Linda Wijkström from Elitfotboll Dam. The 42 members, with the non-ECA member clubs marked in italics, are as follows:

KFF Vllaznia (ALB), Sturm Graz (AUT), RSC Anderlecht (BEL), SFK 2000 Sarajevo (BIH), AC Sparta Praha (CZE), SK Slavia Praha (CZE), Apollon Ladies FC (CYP), Brøndby (DEN), Fortuna Hjørring (DEN) Arsenal Ladies (ENG), Manchester City Ladies (ENG), Chelsea Ladies (ENG), Club Atlético de Madrid (ESP), Athletic Club (ESP), FC Barcelona (ESP) Nõmme Kalju FC (EST), HJK Helsinki (FIN), Olympique Lyonnais Féminin (FRA), Paris Saint-Germain (FRA), Montpellier Hérault Sport Club (FRA), Paris FC (FRA), 1. FFC Turbine Potsdam (GER), Bayern Munich (GER), Ferencvárosi TC (HUN), UMF Stjarnan (ISL), Fiorentina Women's FC (ITA), Juventus FC (ITA), Birkirkara (MLT), AFC Ajax (NED), Linfield FC (NIR), Stabæk FK (NOR), KKPK Medyk Konin (POL), PFC CSKA Moskva (RUS), MŠK Žilina (SVK), Elitfotboll Dam (SWE), Linköpings FK (SWE), Djurgårdens IF (SWE), Zürich Frauen (SUI).

Achievements 
Under a Memorandum of Understanding signed by UEFA in 2008, the European Club Association was recognized as the sole body representing the interests of clubs at European level. As part of the Memorandum of Understanding, UEFA also agreed to distribute every four years an amount from the UEFA European Championship to national associations for them to pass on to their clubs who have contributed to the successful staging of a European Championship. The target distribution amount for Euro 2008 is €43.5 million (US$62.8 million), with the payments made on a "per day per player" basis of approximately €4,000. As part of the planned moves, UEFA and FIFA will also enter into a series of commitments to the clubs, including financial contributions for player participation in European Championships and World Cups, subject to the approval of their respective bodies.

A renewed Memorandum of Understanding for the period 2012–2018 was signed on 22 March 2012 between ECA and UEFA at the occasion of the XXXVI Ordinary UEFA Congress. The memorandum was signed by ECA Chairman Karl-Heinz Rummenigge and UEFA President Michel Platini. It paves the way for a fruitful relationship between European clubs and Europe's football governing body, reflecting an improved balance between national team and club football. The new MoU supersedes the 2008 MoU and is now in effect until 30 May 2018. The four key topics of the new MoU are as follows:

International Match Calendar

The International Match Calendar, a key topic of discussions, makes the release of national team players compulsory for clubs on the dates it highlights. The 2014–18 International Match Calendar is based on a concrete proposal put forward by ECA, and the efforts of a dedicated working group comprising representatives from ECA, European Leagues, FIFPro, and UEFA. The working group's recommendation, acknowledged by FIFA, offers a more balanced system of nine double-headers over two years with no single friendly matches and is beneficial for both clubs and national associations.

Insurance for Players' Salaries

The Club Protection Program, initially put in place at the expense of UEFA to cover the Euro 2012 in Poland and Ukraine, has since been taken over at FIFA's expense following the approval by the FIFA Congress in Budapest in May 2012. It now covers all clubs that release players for national A-team matches listed on the International Match Calendar, including a FIFA commitment to insure the football tournament of the Olympic Games.
The Club Protection Program provides compensation for clubs in the event that national A-team players participating for their national association suffer a temporary total disablement (TTD) as a result of bodily injuries caused by an accident. Players are insured up to a maximum of one year from the day of the excess period (= date of injury + 27 days) and a maximum of €7.5 million.

Distribution for EURO Benefits

As stipulated in the 2008 MoU between ECA and UEFA, the UEFA Executive Committee agreed to set aside provisions of €43.5 million for Euro 2008 in Switzerland and Austria, and €55 million for Euro 2012 in Poland and Ukraine. With the renewal of the MoU, the benefits for clubs releasing players for the Euro 2012 have increased to €100 million and are set to increase again to €150 million for Euro 2016.
In view of the increased amounts of benefits received by clubs, UEFA and ECA have elaborated a new distribution mechanism. The main objective of this distribution mechanism is to have a fair and balanced system, ensure increased benefit for all clubs compared to previous tournaments, and guarantee more clubs are entitled to receive a share of the benefits. For the Euro 2012, the total amount of €100 million was split between the final tournament (60%) and the qualifying phase (40%).
This new distribution mechanism led to 578 clubs receiving varying amounts of compensation from UEFA for their part in releasing players for qualifying matches and the final tournament, a significant increase from the 181 clubs who received a share after the UEFA EURO 2008.

Governance

Finally, the new MoU has also granted a greater influence for clubs in the decision-making processes at UEFA. In the future, clubs are guaranteed to have their voices heard and that no decision directly affecting club football will be taken without their prior consent. ECA representatives from the executive board are appointed in both the UEFA Executive Committee, UEFA Club Competitions Committee, UEFA Professional Football Strategy Council and the UEFA Women's Football Committee.

Education 

Club Management Guide (CMG)

Published for the first time in 2015 the Club Management Guide aims to spread the knowledge and know-how of club management between football clubs in Europe, as well as offering a practical benchmark in which clubs can learn from. The CMG reviews different aspects of club management such as a club's sporting, business and community activities, as well as internal and external environments and strategy development. The CMG is compiled using personal experiences, case studies, graphs, written content and key lessons learned. The CMG does not claim to have a perfect template for how a football club should be run, it looks to offer effective insights and the sharing of real life examples for the benefit of clubs.

Club Management Programme (CMP)

The CMP was created by the requests of clubs for clubs and as a follow up to the Club Management Guide. The CMP aims at strengthening the knowledge of ECA Member Clubs in all areas of club management through the sharing of relevant expertise and know-how. The programme runs for over a year and a half, during this time there are six interactive seminars based around a different topic of club management in some of the top football venues around Europe. The seminars are a mix of academic and professional presentations, club case studies as well as interactive group working sessions. The programme enables participants to expand their knowledge on club football as well as sharing their personal experiences.

Publications 

Community & Social Responsibility Report

In September 2011, the European Club Association published its first Community & Social Responsibility (CSR) Report. The aim of this publication was to present the beneficial work of European football clubs in the field of CSR. The report is a collection of 54 ECA Member clubs’ CSR projects. All projects underline that football, and sport in general, have an important social and educational role to play.

ECA Legal Bulletin

As of 2011, the European Club Association has published a yearly Legal Bulletin, outlining key recurrent legal issues faced by club representatives. The legal bulletins aim to provide support and advice to clubs on how to deal with particular problems regarding training compensation, dealing with clubs in administration, third party ownership, etc....

ECA Report on Youth Academies in Europe

In September 2012, ECA published a Report on Youth Academies in Europe, which acts as a benchmark and provides a comparable perspective that underlines different approaches and philosophies of youth academies across Europe.

ECA Study on the Transfer System in Europe

In March 2014, ECA published a study on the transfer system, which offers an in-depth overview of all the incoming and outgoing transfer transactions involving European clubs over a two-year period. The ECA Executive Board mandated PricewaterhouseCoopers (PwC) and LIUC University to carry out this work.

ECA Women's Club Football Analysis

In 2014, ECA published an analysis on Women's Football. This report of the ECA analyses women's football from a club perspective. Topics such as women's club structure, relations with stakeholders as well as key success and constraint factors in the women's game are addressed.

ECA Club Management Guide (see education)

Published in 2015, this publication is a unique mixture of practical and conceptual football club management, focusing on club core activities, environment and strategies. The ECA Club Management Guide is a collation of club representatives’ practical experiences in managing a football club. An extract is available in 9 languages.

Founding members 
The following 16 clubs founded the ECA in 2008. Clubs currently being an Ordinary Member Club are marked in italics:

Anderlecht

Dinamo Zagreb

Copenhagen

Chelsea
Manchester United

Lyon

Bayern Munich

Olympiacos

Juventus
Milan

Birkirkara

Ajax

Porto

Rangers

Barcelona
Real Madrid

Current ECA members 

Ordinary Member Clubs (110) are marked in italics

See also
 European Leagues
 European Multisport Club Association
 Proposals for a European Super League in association football – A project for a sole pan-European Football League in which the European Club Association has been involved

References

External links
 Official website

Association football in Europe
Association football organizations
International sports bodies based in Switzerland
2008 establishments in Europe
Sports organizations established in 2008